Rotimi Alakija (born 16 October 1980), better known as DJ Xclusive, is a Nigerian disc jockey, record producer and recording artist.

Early life 
Rotimi Alakija was born in England to Nigerian parents. At an early age, he moved back to Nigeria to pursue a high school education at King's College, Lagos. Rotimi Alakija moved back to the UK to study Physics and Computer Science at Reading University, where he earned a Bachelor's degree. He later studied Financial Computing at Brunel University London.

Career 
DJ Xclusive started his professional disc jockey career in 2003 by performing at various night clubs, including Aura Mayfair, Penthouse, Funky Buddha and Jalouse. During the course of his career, DJ Xclusive has performed with acts like Ne-Yo, Rihanna, Mario Winans, Brick and Lace, Nas and Fat Joe.

At the 2010 edition of the Nigeria Entertainment Awards, held in the United States, DJ Xclusive won World Best DJ. He was nominated for Best DJ at the 2011 edition of the BEFFTA Awards. He was also featured at the 2013 Big Brother House Party.

In 2011, DJ Xclusive became the resident DJ for CoolFM 96.9 and also joined Empire Mates Entertainment as Wizkid's official DJ. DJ Xclusive released a single "I'm Xclusive" alongside UK-Nigerian artist Mo Eazy.

Personal life
Dj Xclusive married Tinuke Ogundero in 2015. He is also the nephew of Nigerian billionaire Folorunsho Alakija.

Discography

Singles
"Pangolo" (featuring Timaya)
"Ibebe" (featuring Olamide) (2013) 
"Gal bad" (featuring D'Prince and Wizkid) (2014)
"Jeje" (featuring Wizkid (2014)
"Fatasi" (featuring Terry G) (2014)
"Tonight" (featuring Banky W and Niyola) (2014)
"Shaba" (featuring Kcee and Patoranking) (2014)
"Dami Si" (featuring Lil Kesh and CDQ) (2015)
"Oyoyo" (featuring Burna Boy) (2016)
"Sharwama" (featuring Masterkraft) (2016)                           
 "Pose" (featuring Tiwa Savage)(2017)
 Gbomo Gbomo (featuring Zlatan Ibile)(2019)
"Mad O" (2020)
"Buga" (featuring T-Classic) (2020)
"Sweet 16" (featuring Soft)) (2020)
"Pariwo" (featuring Dotman)(2020)

Videography

Compilation albums
 Empire Mates State of Mind (2012)
 According To X (2015)

See also
List of Nigerian DJs

References

External links
The official Dj Xclusive website

1980 births
21st-century British musicians
Alakija family
Alumni of Brunel University London
Alumni of the University of Reading
Black British DJs
English people of Nigerian descent
English people of Yoruba descent
King's College, Lagos alumni
Living people
Nigerian hip hop DJs
Yoruba musicians
Yoruba-language singers